The Ancient Allan is a novel by H. Rider Haggard.

Plot
Though The Ancient Allan features Haggard's recurring hero Allan Quatermain, most of the plot concerns one of his past lives. In the frame story, he and Lady Ragnall (introduced in The Ivory Child) inhale taduki, a fictional drug that induces visions of previous incarnations. Thus, Quartermain relives the experiences of ancient Egyptian aristocrat Shabaka (a descendant of the pharaoh 
of the same name)—alongside flashes of his earlier lives—and Ragnall those of Amada, an ancient priestess of Isis; several recurring characters of the Quartermain novels also appear under various guises.

Reception
E. F. Bleiler stated the novel had "reasonably good adventure material in the first portion of the novel, but threadbare characterizations and Victorian ethics."

References

External links
Complete novel at Project Gutenberg

Novels by H. Rider Haggard
1920 British novels
1920 fantasy novels
Fiction set in 1882